Stahlfeder: Tekkou Hikuudan is a 1996 Japanese video game released for the Sony PlayStation. It is a vertical scrolling shooting game developed and published by Santos. The game was generally poorly received by critics at the time and has since become an obscure title for the system.

Development 
The game was shown off at PlayStation Expo '96 in Tokyo. There it was shown off alongside another vertically scrolling shooting game, Gunbird by Atlus.

Developer Santos only made three games for the PlayStation before folding.

The game features parallax scrolling, and polygons for several enemies and bosses in the game.

Gameplay 
The game is a vertical scrolling shooting game, featuring six levels 

Players can select from four different types of planes, and use weapons such as lasers and bombs.

Real time three dimensional graphics are used for bosses and terrain. The game has three levels of difficulty.

Release 
The game was released on January 26, 1996, for the Sony PlayStation console in Japan. The game has never been re-released for the PlayStation Network Game Archives.

Reception 

The game generally received mixed reviews upon release. Four reviewers from Famitsu gave the game a score of 22 out of 40. The game was reviewed by several magazines outside of Japan. The Italian magazine Game Power gave it a positive score of 71 out of 100.

Three reviewers for Gamefan gave the game scores of 60, 38, 55, for a total of 51 out of 100. Several reviewers complained about the pace of the game, the lack of challenge, the music being repetitive, and it generally being boring. They did praise the variety of ships however, but noted that while the game is better than Two-Tenkaku, but not other shooters on the system such as Gunbird, TwinBee Yahho, and Philosoma. Another reviewer pointed out that the graphics looked more like a 16-bit game, and another pointed out that it is only 30 minutes to beat. One reviewer compared the game to a "festering boil" and said "If you absolutely must have a shooter don't buy Stahlfeder!".

Next Generation was positive.

Edge Magazine

Video games preview.

UK magazine Play gave the game a score of 65%.

See also 

 Gaia Seed: Project Trap

References 

1996 video games
Video games set in the 1940s
PlayStation (console) games
PlayStation (console)-only games
Steampunk video games
Vertically scrolling shooters
Video games developed in Japan
Video games featuring female protagonists
Japan-exclusive video games